This is a list containing the different written works about Madonna, including biographies and other literary forms. Many authors have written more than one book about Madonna and these have been published in multiple languages other than English, including German, French, Dutch, Spanish and Italian. The releases have sometimes become bestsellers and have faced varied reception from critics and academics. The staff of Xtra Magazine commented that "she has inspired a mini publishing industry all her own". Maura Johnston said that "the appetite for books on Madonna is large, and the variety of approaches writers, editors, and photographers have taken to craft their portraits is a testament to how her career has both inspired and provoked". On the report of Eric Weisbard "only Madonna books proliferated" compared to her other contemporary fellows from the 1980s. Evelyn Briceno from La Tercera described her as a character worthy of biographies, photo books and various analyses.

According to critic Paul Northup who wrote in Third Way magazine, "eminent authors and academics have pored over her tirelessly since she burst onto the pop scene in the early Eighties." The continual interest by many writers towards Madonna was expressed by Rodrigo Fresán in 2008: "and the years go by and life changes but something remains constant: one continues to write about Madonna", while J. Randy Taraborrelli wrote in 2018, "I have never stopped writing about Madonna since that day I first met her thirty-five years ago". The literature about Madonna is "extensive" according to associate professor Robert Miklitsch of Ohio University, and Stephen Brown from University of Ulster described "is almost mind-boggling in its abundance". Pamela Church Gibson from University of the Arts London realized it saying in Fashion and Celebrity Culture (2013), "there is a veritable library of literature available" on Madonna.

Biographies released about the singer include Madonna: An Intimate Biography (2002) by Taraborrelli, Madonna (2001) by Andrew Morton, Madonna: Like an Icon (2007) by Lucy O'Brien, Madonnaland (2016) by Alina Simone, Life with My Sister Madonna (2008) by her brother Christopher Ciccone and Madonna: Bawdy and Soul (1997) by Karlene Faith. Morton's biography was criticized by Madonna herself and she was also against the release of Ciccone's book, which ultimately led to a rift between the siblings.

Books written in English

1980s

1990s

2000s

2010s

Non-English books

Essays and other works

Notes

References

Citations

Book sources

External links
 
 

Madonna
 
Works about Madonna
Music bibliographies